Elrad – Magazin für Elektronik und technische Rechneranwendung (Magazine for electronics and technical applied computing) was a popular German computer magazine for a semi-professional audience, published by the Heinz Heise publishing house in Hannover from November 1977 to June 1997. 

In 1983, one of elrads supplements, computing today, was separated into an own publication, the now popular magazine c't. In 1992, elrad swallowed the German magazine Der Elektroniker which then ceased to exist as a separate entity.

The name rights and subscription base were sold to Bruchmann publishers in 1997 who continued to publish the magazine from July 1997 until their bankruptcy in 1998. The last issue under new ownership was published in August 1998. In 2005 Heise published an archive DVD with facsimiles of all issues published under its ownership.

References

1977 establishments in West Germany
1997 disestablishments in Germany
Defunct computer magazines
Defunct magazines published in Germany
Computer magazines published in Germany
German-language magazines
Monthly magazines published in Germany
Hobby electronics magazines
Magazines established in 1977
Magazines disestablished in 1997
Mass media in Hanover